Hawaii (also known as I am Hawaii) was a 1966 theme song composed by Elmer Bernstein for the 1966 film of the same name. After the film's release, Mack David added lyrics to the song in October 1966. The song was subsequently covered by artists such as Don Ho (for the 1966 album, Tiny Bubbles) and Cathy Foy (in a medley with "Follow Me" from the 1962 film, Mutiny on the Bounty), the winner of the 1975 Miss Hawaii pageant. Foy's cover received greater national attention when it accompanied Angela Perez Baraquio's hula performance on Miss America 2001 before Baraquio became Miss America. The song also received a cover by composer Henry Mancini in his 1966 album, "Music of Hawaii". It peaked at #6 on Billboard's Adult Contemporary chart.

Composition
The song was composed in F major and transposed in C major.

In popular culture

Don Ho's cover was featured in the Season 8 Hawaii Five-0 episode, "Make Me Kai".

References

1966 songs
Songs about Hawaii
Songs written for films
Songs with lyrics by Mack David
Songs with music by Elmer Bernstein